"Favorite" (stylized as "favOriTe") is the debut single released by South Korean girl group Loona. It was released on August 7, 2018, by Blockberry Creative as a digital single. This was their first release as a full twelve-member group.

Composition 
The lyrics were written by Kim Su-jung and Jaden Jeong. It was produced by Sophia Pae and BADD's SlyBerry, Billie Jean, and Kim Jin-hyeong. It was described by Billboard as a brassy dance track that overflows with charisma and bright percussion. Adding that with prominent trills and trumpeting synths propelling the melody to its dynamic chorus, plus a woozy, alt R&B bridge later in the song, the song condenses the act's innovative nature into a boisterous tune.

Background and release 
A music video teaser was released on August 1, 2018.

"Favorite" was released as a digital single on August 7, 2018, through several music portals, including Melon and iTunes.

Commercial performance 
"favOriTe" peaked at number 4 on the US World Digital Song Sales chart, their first and highest entry as a group until the release of single "365".

Music video 
The music video was released alongside the single on August 7. The video focuses on the group's choreography, featuring the twelve members wearing simple uniform-inspired blouse and skirt looks.

As of December 25, 2022, the favOriTe's music video has reached 14 million views on YouTube.

Charts

Release history

References 

2018 singles
2018 songs
Loona (group) songs
Blockberry Creative singles